Subhadeep Chatterjee is an Indian molecular biologist and a scientist at the Centre for DNA Fingerprinting and Diagnostics (CDFD). A member of Guha Research Conference, he is known for his studies on plant-microbe interactions and heads the Lab of Plant-Microbe Interactions at CDFD where he hosts several researchers.

Chatterjee, after earning an M.Sc. in Biotechnology from Guru Nanak Dev University, Amritsar, did his doctoral research at the laboratory of Ramesh Venkata Sonti of the Centre for Cellular and Molecular Biology (CCMB), Hyderabad. His post-doctoral work was at the laboratory of Steven E. Lindow at the University of California, Berkeley. He is known to have carried out extensive research on plant- microbe interaction system and has published a number of articles, ResearchGate, an online repository of scientific articles has listed 52 of them. The Department of Biotechnology of the Government of India awarded him the National Bioscience Award for Career Development, one of the highest Indian science awards, for his contributions to biosciences, in 2017/18.

Subhadeep Chatterjee was awarded the Shanti Swarup Bhatnagar Prize for Science and Technology, the highest science award in India, for the year 2020 in biological sciences category.

Selected bibliography

See also 

 Xanthomonas
 Siderophore
 Xanthoferrin

Notes

References

External links 
 

Indian scientific authors
Year of birth missing (living people)
N-BIOS Prize recipients
Indian molecular biologists
Guru Nanak Dev University alumni
University of California, Berkeley alumni
People from West Bengal
Living people
Scientists from West Bengal